Gjertrud Schnackenberg (born August 27, 1953, in Tacoma, Washington) is an American poet.

Life
Schnackenberg graduated from Mount Holyoke College in 1975. She lectured at Massachusetts Institute of Technology and Washington University in St. Louis, and was Writer-in-Residence at Smith College and visiting fellow at St. Catherine's College, Oxford, in 1997.

The Throne of Labdacus, one of Schnackenberg's six books of poetry, focuses on the myth of Oedipus and the stories of ancient Greece. In A Gilded Lapse of Time she devotes a section to the life, poetry, and death of Dante. Schnackenberg has received the Rome Prize in Creative Literature from the American Academy in Rome and the Berlin Prize from the American Academy in Berlin. She has been awarded a grant from the National Endowment for the Arts, and in 1987 she received a Guggenheim grant. She has been a fellow of the American Academy of Arts and Sciences since 1996. In 1997, she was the Christensen Visiting Fellow at St. Catherine's College, Oxford, and in 2000 she was a visiting scholar at the Getty Research Institute for the History of Art and the Humanities. She won an Academy Award in Literature from the American Academy of Arts and Letters in 1998, and in 2001 she won the LA Times Book Prize in Poetry for The Throne of Labdacus. In 2011, she won the Griffin Poetry Prize (worth CDN $65,000) for Heavenly Questions.

Schnackenberg was married to the American philosopher Robert Nozick until his death in 2002.

Awards and honors
Schnackenberg has been awarded the Academy Award in Literature from the American Academy of Arts and Letters, the Berlin Prize from the American Academy in Berlin, and the Rome Prize in Creative Literature from the American Academy in Rome, as well as fellowships from the National Endowment for the Arts, Radcliffe Institute, and the Guggenheim Foundation. Today, she travels around the world reading her poetry in public, university, and conference settings.

 2011: Heavenly Questions wins the 2011 International Griffin Poetry Prize
 2001: Los Angeles Times Book Prize in Poetry
 2000: The Throne of Labdacus named a "notable book of the year" by The New York Times
 1998: American Academy of Arts and Letters Awards, Rome Prize in Literature
 1984–1985: Amy Lowell Poetry Travelling Scholarship
 1984 Younger Poets Award from Academy of American Poets
 1974 and 1975: Glascock Prize from Mount Holyoke College

Works

Poetry Magazine
The Boboli Gardens, Volume 124, June 1974, Page 125
Signs, Volume 124, June 1974, Page 125
Kandinsky's Night, Volume 124, June 1974, Page 125
From Laughing with One Eye, Volume 132, June 1978, Page 161

Poetry Foundation
"Angels Grieving over the Dead Christ", Poetry Foundation
"Sonata", Poetry Foundation
"Supernatural Love", Poetry Foundation
"Two Tales of Clumsy", Poetry Foundation

Reviews
The poetry of Gjertrud Schnackenberg has always seemed to be written white-on-black, not only because her lines have the tuned quality of work that has absorbed how sheer is the drop from white to black, from utterance to nothing, but also because the well-springs of her art seem connected at some profound level to the witnessing of light against dark or dark against light. These two factors are both the cause and the effect of the work's sustained dignity and strength [...] Schackenberg has rarely seemed in dialogue with any contemporary, and perhaps for this reason she is one of the few American poets whose voice one might recognize in a line [...] Much of her best work, even in the poems that most obviously manifest such width and perspective, is in the exquisite accuracy with which she beholds details, as if the bright child did her true apprenticeship not in the beam of the study lamp, but in the glow of the dollhouse windows.--Glyn Maxwell, The New Republic

[Schnackenberg's] poems wrestle with moral failure not in the light of philosophy but in the darkness after it. – William Logan, The New Criterion

Gjertrud Schnackenberg stands out among younger American poets for her ambition, in the best sense of the word. Her verse is strong, dense and musical, anchored in the pentameter even when it veers into irregularity; behind it are formidable masters, Robert Lowell most notably, but also Yeats and Auden. Lowellian, too, is her desire to treat history as something more than a stage setting, to make it the medium of thought and feeling. --Adam Kirsch, The New York Times Book Review

References

External links
 Griffin Poetry Prize biography of Gjertrud Schnackenberg, including video clip
 Gjertrud Schnackenberg reading at University of Iowa, 2004
 "Gjertrud Schnackenberg: Heavenly Questions", The New York Review of Books

1953 births
Living people
American people of Norwegian descent
Writers from Tacoma, Washington
Formalist poets
Glascock Prize winners
Mount Holyoke College alumni
American women poets
20th-century American poets
20th-century American women writers
21st-century American poets
21st-century American women writers
Massachusetts Institute of Technology faculty
Washington University in St. Louis faculty
Fellows of St Catherine's College, Oxford